This article lists English association football clubs whose men's sides have won competitive honours run by official governing bodies. Friendly competitions and matches organized between clubs are not included. The football associations FIFA and UEFA run international and European competitions; while The Football Association, and its mostly self-governing subsidiary bodies the English Football League and Premier League, run national competitions.

The European governing body UEFA was founded in 1954, and created their first and most prestigious competition, the European Cup, the next year. It was expanded and renamed in 1992 as the UEFA Champions League. Liverpool hold the English record, with six wins. Parallel to UEFA, various officials created the Inter-Cities Fairs Cup in 1955, but this competition was disbanded when UEFA created the replacement tournament, UEFA Cup, in 1971 (renamed the UEFA Europa League in 2009). The English record number of Europa League wins is three, also held by Liverpool. Another competition absorbed into the UEFA Cup, in 1999, was the UEFA Cup Winners' Cup, which was created in 1960 and featured the winners of national knockout competitions. The winners of this competition played the European Cup winners in the UEFA Super Cup, starting in 1972 (recognised by UEFA in 1973), which now features the winners of the Champions League and Europa League. Liverpool also hold the English record, with four wins, in the UEFA Super Cup. The International Football Cup, also known as the UEFA Intertoto Cup, was a competition for clubs not participating in the European Cup, UEFA Cup or Cup Winners' Cup. The tournament commenced in 1961, but UEFA officially recognised it only in 1995, and discontinued in 2008, with the Europa League expanded to accommodate Intertoto Cup clubs. UEFA and CONMEBOL also created an intercontinental competition in 1960, the Intercontinental Cup, featuring continental champions from both associations. In 2000, the international governing body FIFA created the FIFA Club World Cup and in 2004 the Intercontinental Cup was merged into it. Manchester United are the only English club to have won the Intercontinental Cup, while United, Chelsea and Liverpool are the only English teams to have lifted the Club World Cup.

England's first competition organised by a national body, the FA Cup, began in the 1871–72 season, making it one of the oldest football competitions in the world. Arsenal hold the record number of wins, with 14. League football began in the next decade with the founding of The Football League in 1888–89. The name First Division was adopted in 1892, when The Football League gained a second division. The First Division remained the highest division of the English league system until 1992, when the Premier League was founded. Manchester United have won the most top division titles, 20. The English equivalent of the super cup began in 1898 with the inauguration of the Sheriff of London Charity Shield, pitting the best professional and amateur sides of the year against each other. The trophy would develop into the FA Charity Shield in 1908, which was later renamed the FA Community Shield in 2002. Manchester United also hold the record here, with 21 wins. The Football League created its own knockout competition in 1960, the League Cup. Its current record is nine wins, held by Liverpool. The Anglo-Italian League Cup was created in 1969 to match English cup winners against the winners of the Coppa Italia, and was permanently disbanded in 1976. In 1985, the Full Members' Cup and Football League Super Cup were created as substitutes for UEFA competitions after UEFA responded to the Heysel Stadium disaster by banning English clubs. They finished in 1992 and 1986, respectively. The Football League Centenary Trophy marked The Football League's 100th birthday, in the 1988–89 season.

Lower down in the hierarchy of English football are many other competitions, not included in the tables on this page. These include competitions run by the above national governing bodies, but organised for clubs ineligible for higher competitions. For example, the Texaco Cup and EFL Trophy. Regional competitions are organised by County Football Associations. In the years when league football was unavailable or only available to northern and midlands clubs, the county competitions coexisted with the FA Cup as the main tournaments for clubs. Nowadays, county cups are contested by lower or regional division teams and those that still participate generally field youth or reserve sides.

Summary totals
Numbers in bold are record totals for that category. Clubs in italics are Double winners: they have won two or more of these trophies in the same season (excluding super cups). Trophies that were shared between two clubs are counted as honours for both teams. Clubs tied in total honours are listed chronologically by most recent honour won. See the other tables for breakdowns of each competition won.

Cups here are competitions with a knockout format. Among FIFA and UEFA competitions, these are the UEFA Champions League, the Inter-Cities Fairs Cup, the UEFA Europa League, the UEFA Cup Winners' Cup, the UEFA Intertoto Cup, and the FIFA Club World Cup. Among top-qualifying competitions overseen by The FA, these are the top division, the FA Cup, the League Cup, the Full Members' Cup, the Football League Super Cup and the Football League Centenary Trophy. Super cups here consist of the honours that have or had only two participating clubs per season. These are the Intercontinental Cup, the UEFA Super Cup, the FA Community Shield and its precursor the Sheriff of London Charity Shield. The Anglo-Italian League Cup is also listed as a super cup because it only had two clubs competing per season.

Last updated on 26 February 2023, following Manchester United winning the 2022–23 EFL Cup.

FIFA and UEFA

Winners of each competition are referenced above. Numbers in bold are English record totals for that competition. Trophies that were shared between two clubs are counted as honours for both teams. Clubs tied in total honours are listed chronologically by most recent honour won.

Last updated on 12 February 2022.

FA, EFL and PL (top-qualifying)

This section only lists competitions overseen by The FA (and its subsidiary leagues the EFL and Premier League) where there are no higher competitions clubs could participate in instead. See the next section for other competitions run by these bodies. See the main article for winners of friendly competitions run by these bodies.

Winners of each competition are referenced above. Numbers in bold are record totals for that competition. Clubs in italics are Double winners: they have won two or more of the top division, the FA Cup, and the EFL Cup in the same season. Trophies that were shared between two clubs are counted as honours for both teams. Clubs tied in total honours are listed chronologically by most recent honour won.

Last updated on 26 February 2023.

FA, EFL and PL (lower-qualifying)

In addition to the honours listed in the section above, England's football governing bodies have also organized a variety of less prominent competitions for clubs not eligible for the honours above. One example is the Texaco Cup (or International League Board Competition), which was available for top division sides that hadn't qualified for Europe, and was one of the few attempts to create a cross-border competition between clubs from the various nations of the UK and Ireland. Another is the EFL Trophy, which involves clubs from League One and League Two (the third and fourth tiers of the English football league system). Since 2016–17 season, sixteen Category One academies from Championship and Premier League have taken part in the competition.

County FAs

English football also has a network of regional governing bodies known as County Football Associations. These associations are roughly based around county lines, although some cover multiple counties or the boundaries of major cities. They generally have a Senior Cup, such as the Kent Senior Cup or Middlesex Senior Cup, as their premier competition for men's clubs. In some cases, such as the Kent and Middlesex Senior Cups, these involve the senior first-teams of lower-division or regional-division clubs; in other cases it can have other formats, such as the Manchester Senior Cup, which became a reserve team competition for six large clubs from the region. In the years when league football was unavailable or only available to northern and midlands clubs, the Senior Cups coexisted with the FA Cup as the main tournaments for clubs.

See also
List of English football champions
List of UEFA club competition winners
List of FA and league honours won by men's clubs

Footnotes

References

External links

Honours
Clubs by honours